Patrik Werner (born 16 March 1976) is a Swedish football manager and former player. He works at Degerfors IF as the director of football.

References

1976 births
Living people
Association football forwards
Swedish footballers
Degerfors IF players
Husqvarna FF players
Degerfors IF managers
Swedish football managers